Dame Jessica Mary Rawson,  (born 20 January 1943) is an English art historian, curator and sinologist. She is also an academic administrator, specialising in Chinese art.

After many years at the British Museum, she was Warden (head) of Merton College, Oxford, from 1994 until her retirement in 2010. She served as pro-vice-chancellor at University of Oxford from 2006 for a term of five years.

Biography
Rawson's academic background is in Sinology with a particular research focus on the cosmology of the Han period (206 BC-AD 220) and its relation to tombs and their decoration. Educated at St Paul's Girls' School in Hammersmith, West London, New Hall, Cambridge and the University of London, Rawson began her career in the civil service.

Between 1976 and 1994, she served as Deputy Keeper and then Keeper of the Department of Oriental Antiquities at the British Museum. From 1994 to 2010 she was Warden of Merton College, Oxford, and from 2006 to 2011 she served as pro-vice-chancellor of Oxford University. She has been involved in a number of high-profile exhibitions such as the Mysteries of Ancient China.

Rawson contributed with Evelyn S. Rawski and other scholars to the catalogue of China: The Three Emperors by Frances Wood. The exhibition ran at the Royal Academy of Arts in 2005–06.

From 2011 to 2016, Rawson headed a project at the University of Oxford on China and Inner Asia: Interactions Which Changed China (1000-200 BC) funded by the Leverhulme Trust, with Jianjun Mei as collaborator. This project explored relations between Ancient China and peoples of the Eurasian Steppes, particularly to the north and north-west. As of 2015, Rawson was also listed as a project partner on the RLAHA project FLow of Ancient Metals across Eurasia (FLAME) funded by the European Research Council.

Honours
Rawson is a Fellow of the British Academy, a member of the Scholars' Council of the Kluge Center at the Library of Congress and a member of the Art Fund's Advisory Council. She was made a Commander of the Order of the British Empire (CBE) in the 1994 Birthday Honours and advanced Dame Commander of the Order of the British Empire (DBE) in the 2002 New Year Honours for services to oriental studies.

In 2012, Rawson was elected to the American Academy of Arts and Sciences as a Foreign Honorary Member.

In May 2017 she was awarded the Charles Lang Freer Medal in recognition of her lifetime's contribution to the study of Chinese art and archaeology. In 2022 she received the Tang Prize in Sinology.

Personal life
Rawson is married with one daughter.

Bibliography
Chinese pots 7th-13th century AD (1977) London: British Museum Publications.
Ancient China, art and archaeology (1980) London: British Museum Publications.
The Chinese Bronzes of Yunnan (1983) London and Beijing: Sidgwick and Jackson.
Chinese ornament: The lotus and the dragon (1984) London: British Museum Publications
Chinese bronzes: Art and ritual (1987) London: Published for the Trustees of the British Museum in association with the Sainsbury Centre for Visual Arts, University of East Anglia.
Chinese jade from the Neolithic to the Qing (1995) London: British Museum Press.
Mysteries of Ancient China (1996) London: British Museum Press.
China: The Three Emperors, 1662-1795 (2005) London: Royal Academy of Arts.

References

1943 births
Alumni of New Hall, Cambridge
Alumni of the University of London
British art historians
British curators
British sinologists
British women historians
Dames Commander of the Order of the British Empire
Employees of the British Museum
Fellows of Merton College, Oxford
Fellows of the American Academy of Arts and Sciences
Fellows of the British Academy
Historians of East Asian art
Living people
Place of birth missing (living people)
Pro-Vice-Chancellors of the University of Oxford
Wardens of Merton College, Oxford
Women art historians
Women orientalists
Slade Professors of Fine Art (University of Cambridge)
British women curators